Carrie Nahabedian (born July 22, 1958) is an American chef best known for her work at the one Michelin star restaurant NAHA in Chicago, Illinois. She has previously worked in a variety of restaurants, and while at NAHA, she won a James Beard Foundation Award in 2008.

Biography
Growing up she was influenced in her cooking by her mother, but also by celebrity chef Julia Child. She later described watching Child as "like watching an artist painting". Nahabedian started her culinary career with a three-year apprenticeship at the Ritz Carlton Hotel in Chicago. She then moved to Atlantic City, New Jersey, to become assistant chef to the garde manger at the Resorts Casino Hotel when it first opened.

She moved back to Chicago to work at Le Perroquet before moving onto a variety of restaurants in Europe before returning to the United States where she became the first woman to work at Chicago's Le Francais. She went on to work at a number of other Illinois-based restaurants. In 1989, she became sous chef at the Four Seasons Hotel Chicago, going on to become executive chef, which was her first time at that level. She stayed within the Four Seasons Hotels chain, moving to the Four Seasons Hotel Biltmore.

After eight years in California with the hotel chain, Nahabedian returned to Chicago to open her restaurant NAHA. It would go on to win a Michelin star and continues to hold one as of the 2012 edition of the guide.

Awards and honors
In 2008, Nahabedian was awarded the James Beard Foundation Award for the Great Lakes region. Mayor of Chicago Richard M. Daley named September 22, 2009 in honor of Nahabedian, the same day that she was inducted into the Chicago Culinary Museum's Chefs Hall of Fame.

Naha was given four AAA Motor Club diamonds for the first time in 2012. As of the 2012 edition of the Michelin Guide, Nahabedian is one of only ten female chefs in the United States to hold a Michelin star.

Personal life
Nahabedian is of Armenian descent, due to her Armenian grandmother Rose.

References

Living people
1958 births
American chefs
American people of Armenian descent
People from Chicago
American women chefs
Head chefs of Michelin starred restaurants
James Beard Foundation Award winners
21st-century American women